The 2020 IFAF U-19 World Championship was scheduled as an international American football tournament for junior teams (19 years and under) which would have taken place at Canton, Ohio from late June to early July 2020. This would have been the second time that Canton, Ohio hosted an IFAF World Junior Championship, the first being the inaugural 2009 IFAF U-19 World Championship.

The event was cancelled by IFAF 3 March 2020 due to complications from the Coronavirus pandemic. The next scheduled world junior championship will be a U-20 competition hosted by Football Canada in Edmonton, Alberta in July 2024.

Participants and Seeding

The dates participants were not announced by IFAF or USA Football prior to the tournament. Based on continental competitions, these are the available teams based on IFAF ranking:

1.  - Defending Champions
2.  - IFAF Americas #1
3.  - Host Nation
4.  - IFAF Asia #1
5   - IFAF Oceania
6   - IFAF Europe #1
7   - (Would be ranked at #4 based on 2018 finish)
8  IFAF Americas #4 - ( or )

References

External links
  

IFAF Junior World Cup
2020 in American football